Passy is a station on Line 6 of the Paris Métro. Located in the 16th arrondissement, it is elevated at its eastern end, while its western end is in the mouth of a tunnel.

Location

It is connected to the Bir-Hakeim métro station and to the 15th arrondissement by the Pont de Bir-Hakeim, which was opened in 1906 and is now classified as a historic monument. In the other direction, the tunnel leads to Trocadéro station. It is close to the Maison de Radio France, the headquarters of Radio France.

History
The station opened as part of the former Line 2 South on 6 November 1903, when it was extended from Trocadéro to Place d'Italie. On 14 October 1907, Line 2 South was incorporated into Line 5. It was incorporated into Line 6 on 12 October 1942. It was named after the old village of Passy, and the Rue de Passy near the station. The villages of Passy, Chaillot and Auteuil were incorporated into Paris under Napoleon III in 1860 to form, with the Bois de Boulogne, the current 16th arrondissement of Paris. The station is near the location of the Barrière de Passy, a gate built for the collection of taxation as part of the Wall of the Farmers-General; the gate was built between 1784 and 1788 and demolished before 1859.

Station layout

Passy station lies above Rue de l'Alboni where the street becomes pedestrianised as a result of a steep grade. Like most Métro stations, it has two tracks and two side platforms; trains on the Métro run on the right, rather than the left as they do in the rest of France. To the west, trains enter a tunnel underneath the higher portion above Rue de l'Alboni.

Gallery

References

Paris Métro stations in the 16th arrondissement of Paris
Railway stations in France opened in 1903
Articles containing video clips